Aimee Stephens (December 7, 1960 – May 12, 2020) was an American funeral director known for her fight for civil rights for transgender people. She worked as a funeral director in Detroit and was fired for being transgender. Based on her court case, in a historic 2020 decision, the U.S. Supreme Court ruled that the 1964 Civil Rights Act protects gay, lesbian, and transgender employees from discrimination based on sex.

Early life and education
Aimee Stephens was born on December 7, 1960 in Fayetteville, N.C. She graduated from Mars Hill University in 1984 with a degree in religious education and obtained a degree in mortuary science from Fayetteville Technical Community College in 1988.

R.G. & G.R. Harris Funeral Homes Inc. v. Equal Employment Opportunity Commission 

Stephens was fired from her job at R.G. & G.R. Harris Funeral Home in Garden City in 2013 after she said she would wear appropriate women's business attire at work. Stephens started a legal case, arguing that she was protected under Title VII of the federal Civil Rights Act of 1964. The funeral home owner argued that since he would have required everyone to dress according to the gender they had been biologically assigned at birth, he hadn't discriminated against her. Justice Neil Gorsuch who argued for the LGBTQ+ community acknowledged that "Congress in 1964 likely did not have the LGBTQ community in mind when it banned discrimination based on sex. But he said the words of the statute are clear."

Personal life
She was married to Donna Stephens for 20 years, and they had one child together.

Death and legacy
Stephens died from complications related to kidney failure on May 12, 2020.

In June 2020, Stephens was added among American “pioneers, trailblazers, and heroes” on the National LGBTQ Wall of Honor within the Stonewall National Monument (SNM) in New York City’s Stonewall Inn. The SNM is the first U.S. national monument dedicated to LGBTQ rights and history.

References 

1960 births
2020 deaths
21st-century American LGBT people
Activists from Michigan
Activists from North Carolina
American funeral directors
Deaths from kidney failure
LGBT people from Michigan
LGBT people from North Carolina
American LGBT rights activists
Mars Hill University alumni
People from Fayetteville, North Carolina
People from Garden City, Michigan
Transgender women